Wallace & Gromit's Musical Marvels (also known as Wallace & Gromit at the Proms) is the name of Prom 20 of the 2012 season of The BBC Proms, which features orchestral renditions of Julian Nott's theme from Wallace & Gromit and classical music set to scenes from the Wallace & Gromit films.  Wallace is performed by Ben Whitehead, the actor who performed Wallace in the episodic adventure game series, Wallace & Gromit's Grand Adventures.  Due to its popularity, it became a full touring show in 2013, premiering at The Plenary in Melbourne, Australia on 9 February 2013.

Plot
Musical Marvels features new animated footage of Wallace and Gromit that are shown between the orchestral pieces.  The animated scenes are made to interact with the conductor on stage through an invention called a Maestromatic.  This is a conductor's stand with a plate of cheese and crackers and a chute which receives letters and compositions from Wallace, who is said to be below the concert hall.  A new musical composition by Wallace is slated to be played by the end of the night, called "My Concerto in Ee, Lad".  Wallace invented a mechanized petrol powered piano called the pianomatic to play the tune, but the invention backfired on itself and the piano, along with his concerto, was destroyed. Gromit ended up saving the night by composing his own musical piece, "A Double Concerto for Violin and Dog", which he played on a priceless Stradivarius violin found below the concert hall over the monitor with English classical violinist Tasmin Little. In the end, Wallace congratulates Gromit for a job well done, gives him a bouquet of flowers from a mechanized flower dispenser, and sits down on the Stradivarius violin.

Program
 Csárdás by Vittorio Monti - with Tasmin Little
The Infernal Dance of King Katschei from the Firebird Suite by Igor Stravinsky - set to a montage of W&G villains Feathers McGraw, Preston, Victor and Piella Bakewell
 Clair de Lune by Claude Debussy - set to a montage featuring Wendolene, Lady Tottington and Piella
Overture of The Magic Flute by Amadeus Wolfgang Mozart
Fugue from 1st Movement of Symphony No. 4 by Dmitri Shostakovich - set to a variety of chase scenes from all 5 W&G adventures
Wing It by Iain Farrington (features samples of the Wallace & Gromit theme as well as I Got Rhythm by George Gershwin)
Romance by Iain Farrington (identified as "Double Concerto for Violin and Dog")

Cast
Ben Whitehead as Wallace
Nicholas Collon as himself
Tasmin Little as herself
Thomas Gould as himself

Production and release
Musical Marvels was performed live at the Royal Albert Hall on 29 July 2012. It featured the Aurora Orchestra conducted by Nicholas Collon who also narrated and 'communicated' with Wallace. It was broadcast live on BBC Radio, and then a later video broadcast was made on BBC One on 27 August.

Due to its popularity, it became a full touring show in 2013.  It premiered at The Plenary in Melbourne, Australia on 9 February 2013.  It was performed at other venues throughout 2013 including the Sydney Opera House, with the animated short film A Matter of Loaf and Death screened at each performance.

References

External links
 Official website
 Sydney Opera House Musical Marvels trailer

Clay animation films
Wallace and Gromit
2012 television films
2010s stop-motion animated films